A dispersal vector is an agent of biological dispersal that moves a dispersal unit, or organism, away from its birth population to another location or population in which the individual will reproduce. These dispersal units can range from pollen to seeds to fungi to entire organisms.

There are two types of dispersal vector, those that are active and those that are passive. Active dispersal involves organisms that are capable of movement under their own energy. In passive dispersal, the organisms have evolved dispersal units, or propagules, that use the kinetic energy of the environment for movement. In plants, some dispersal units have tissue that assists with dispersal and are called diaspores. Some dispersal is self-driven (autochory), such as using gravity (barochory), and does not rely on external vectors. Other types of dispersal are due to external vectors, which can be biotic vectors, such as animals (zoochory), or abiotic vectors, such as the wind (anemochory) or water (hydrochory).

In many cases, organisms will be dispersed by more than one vector before reaching its final destination. It is often a combination of two or more modes of dispersal that act together to maximize dispersal distance, such as wind blowing a seed into a nearby river, that will carry it farther down stream.

Self-generated dispersal 

Autochory is the dispersal of diaspores, which are dispersal units consisting of seeds or spores, using only the energy provided by the diaspore or the parent plant. The plant of origin is the dispersal vector itself, instead of an external vector. There are four main types of autochory that act on diaspores: ballochory, or violent ejection by the parent organism; blastochory, where a diaspore crawls along the ground using stolons; barochory, the use of gravity for dispersal; and herpochory, crawling using hygroscopic hairs called trichomes.

In some cases, ballochory can be more effective when utilizing a secondary dispersal vector: ejecting the seeds in order for them to use wind or water for longer distance dispersal.

Animal dispersal 

Animal-mediated dispersal is called zoochory. Zoochory can be further described by which animal is acting as a dispersal vector. Animals are an important dispersal vector because they provide the ability to transfer dispersal units longer distances than their parent organism can. The main groups include dispersal by birds (ornithochory), dispersal by ants (myrmecochory), dispersal by mammals (mammaliochory), dispersal by amphibians or reptiles, and dispersal by insects, such as bees.

Animals are also a large contributor to pollination via zoophily. Flowering plants overwhelmingly are pollinated by animals, and while invertebrates are involved in the majority of that pollination, birds and mammals also play a role.

Ornithochory 

Birds contribute to seed dispersal in several ways that are unique from general vectors. Birds often cache, or store, the seeds of trees and shrubs for later consumption; only some of these seeds are later recovered and eaten, so many of the seeds are able to utilize the behavior of seed caching to allow them to germinate away from the mother tree.

Long-distance dispersal, which is rare for a parent plant to achieve alone, could be mediated by migratory movements of birds. Long-distance dispersal operates over spatial areas that span thousands of kilometers, which allow it to promote rapid range shifts and determine species distributions.

In seed dispersal, ingestion of seeds that are capable of resisting digestive juices allows the seeds to be scattered in feces and dispersed far from the parent organism. For these seeds, gut passage enhances germination ability when the seeds are ingested by birds and mammals.

Finally, ingestion of herbivores by carnivorous animals may help disperse seeds by preying on primary seed dispersers such as herbivores or omnivores. When a bird is eaten by a cat or another carnivore, that animal will inadvertently consume the seeds that the prey species consumed. These seeds may then be later deposited in a process called diplochory, where a seed is moved by more than one dispersal vector, which is important for seed dispersal outcomes as carnivores range widely and enhance the genetic connectivity of dispersed populations.

Birds act as dispersal vectors for non-seed dispersal units as well. Hummingbirds spread pollen on their beaks, and fungal spores may stick to the bottom of birds’ feet. Water birds may also help to disperse aquatic invertebrates, specifically branchiopods, ostracods, and bryozoans.

Myrmecochory 

This includes all of the dispersal caused by ants, including seed dispersal and the dispersal of leaf matter from trees.

Mammaliochory 
Similarly to birds, dispersal by mammals allows for long distance dispersal, especially via carnivores. The act of carnivores eating primary dispersal vectors (herbivores) can lead to long distance dispersal and connection between different populations of the same species because of large predator ranges in comparison to smaller herbivore ranges. Mammals have been shown to act as dispersal vectors for seeds, spores, and parasites.

Just as in ornithocory, ingestion by herbivores acts as a dispersal vector for seeds, and gut passage increases the rate of germination.
Marsupials, primates, rodents, bats, and some species in the suborder Feliformia (Cape grey mongooses and Cape genets) have all been identified as pollinators. Non-flying mammals have been identified as acting as pollinators in Australia, Africa, South and Central America. Some plants may have traits that coevolved to utilize mammals as dispersal vectors, such as being extremely pungent in odor, nocturnal nectar production, and robust flowers that can handle rough feeders. The pollen of some plants can be found stuck to the fur of mammals as well as accidentally ingested when nectar is consumed.  
Mammals contribute to bryophyte and fern spore dispersal by carrying spores on their fur. Small mammals acting as dispersal vectors may have advantages for the dispersing organism compared to wind transport, as the mammals share similar ecosystems to the parent plant, while wind transport is random. Additionally, mammals can transport spores that have qualities such as low production and non-wind adapted morphology that wouldn't be conducive for wind transport.

Dik-dik, (Madoqua kirkii), Grant's gazelle (Gazella granti), and impala (Aepyceros melampus) become infected by gastrointestinal nematode parasites that lay on vegetation the antelope consume. Once infected, they disperse nematode parasites in their feces. Once consumed, the eggs are spread to a new area via the defecation of small mounds of dung.

Dispersal by amphibians or reptiles 
Frogs and lizards have been found to be dispersal vectors for crustaceans and ring worms, specifically bromeliad ostracods (Elpidium bromeliarum) and annelids (Dero superterrenus). Annelids showed a strong chemical orientation towards moist frog skin that may have developed to diminish risk of dehydration during transport in the environment. The ostracods have frequently been found to be attached to frogs in order to colonize new areas. Both ostracods and annelids will attach themselves to lizards as well, but they prefer to attach themselves to frogs.

Dispersal by Invertebrates 

One of the most important examples of dispersal via invertebrates are pollinators such as bees, flies, wasps, beetles, and butterflies.

Invertebrates may also act as dispersal vectors for the spores of ferns and bryophytes via endozoochory, or the ingestion of the plant.

Wind dispersal 

Anemochory is dispersal of units by wind. Wind is a major vector of long distance dispersal that is responsible for the spread and propagation of species to new habitats. Each species has its own "wind dispersal potential", which is the proportion of dispersal units that travel farther than a predefined reference distance travelled under normal weather conditions. The effectiveness of wind dispersal relies predominantly on the morphological traits and adaptations of the dispersal units and wind conditions. The two main traits of plants that predict their wind dispersal potential are falling velocity and initial release height of the dispersal unit. Higher falling velocity is generally correlated with heavier seeds, which have a lower wind dispersal potential because it takes a stronger wind to carry them. The taller the initial release height of the dispersal unit, the larger the wind dispersal potential because there is a larger window in which it can be picked up by the wind.

Adaptive morphology 
Many species have evolved morphological adaptations to maximize wind dispersal potential. Common examples include plumed, winged, and balloon-like diaspores.

Plumed diaspores have thin hair-like projections that allow easier wind uplift. One of the most common plumed species is the dandelion, Taraxacum officinale. The wind dispersal potential of plumed species are directly correlated to the total mass and total surface area of the projected plume.

Winged diaspores have fibrous tissue that develops on the wall of the seed and projects outward. Seed wings are generally thought to co-evolve with the evolution of larger seeds, in order to increase dispersal and offset the weight of the larger seeds. Some common examples include pine and spruce trees.

Balloon-like seeds are a phenomenon where the calyx, a kind of protective pouch or covering the plant uses to guard the seeds, is light and swollen. This ballon-like structure allows the entire pouch of seeds to be dispersed by gusts of wind. A common example of the balloon-like diaspore is the Trifolium fragiferum, or strawberry clover.

Human effects on anemochory 
Wind dispersal of a particular species can also be affected by human actions. Humans can affect anemochory in three major ways: habitat fragmentation, chemical runoff, and climate change.

Clearing land for development and building roads through forests can lead to habitat fragmentation. Habitat fragmentation reduces the number and size of the effected populations, which reduces the amount of seeds that are dispersed. This lowers the probability that dispersed seeds with germinate and take root.

Chemical runoff from fertilizer, leakages of sewage, and carbon emissions from fossil fuels can also lead to eutrophication, a build up of nutrients that often leads to excess algae and non-native plant growth. Eutrophication can lead to decreased long distance dispersal because the lack of nutrients to native plants causes a decrease in seed release height. However, because of the lowered release height, eutrophication can sometimes lead to an increase in short distance dispersal.

Climate change effects on wind patterns have the potential increase average wind velocity. However, it can also lead to lower levels of wind dispersal for each individual plant or organism because of the effects climate change has on the normal conditions needed for plant growth, such as temperature and rainfall.

Water dispersal 

Hydrochory is dispersal using water, including oceans, rivers, streams, and rain. It affects many different dispersal units, such as seeds, fern spores, zooplankton, and plankton.

Terrestrial water sources tend to be more restricted in their ability to disperse units. Barriers such as mountain ranges, farm land, and urban centers prevent the relatively free movement of dispersal units seen in open bodies of water. Oceanic dispersal can move individuals or reproductive propagules anywhere from a meter to hundreds of kilometers from the original point depending on the size of the individual.

Marine dispersal 

A majority of marine organisms utilize ocean currents and movement within the water column to reproduce. The process of releasing reproductive propagules into the water is called broadcast spawning. While broadcast spawning requires parents to be relatively close to each other for fertilization, the fertilized zygotes can be moved extreme distances. A number of marine invertebrates require ocean currents to connect their gametes once broadcast spawning has occurred. Kelp, an important group of sea plants, primarily utilize ocean currents to distribute their spores and larvae. Many coral species reproduce by releasing gametes into the water column with hopes that other local corals will also release gametes before these units are dispersed by ocean currents.

Some non-submerged aquatic plant species, like palm trees and mangroves, have developed fruits that float in sea water in order to utilize ocean currents as a form of dispersal. Coconuts have been found to travel up to thousands of miles away from their parent tree due to their buoyant nature. A variety of over 100 species of vascular plants utilize this dispersal method for their fruit.

Many plants have evolved with specific adaptations to maximize the distance that seeds, fruits, or propagules are dispersed in the ocean. For an increased protection against sinking in the water column, seeds have developed hair or slime on their outer seed coats. Seeds with filled with air, cork, or oil are better prepared to float for farther distances.

Another aspect of dispersal comes from wave and tidal action. Organisms in shallower waters, such as seagrasses, become displaced and dispersed by waves crashing upon them and tides pulling them out into the open ocean.  

Some smaller marine organisms maximize their own dispersal by attaching to a raft - a biotic or abiotic object that is being moved by the ocean’s currents. Biotic rafts can be floating seeds or fruits, leaves, or other propagules. Abiotic rafts are usually floating woods or plastics, including buoys and discarded trash.

Sea ice is also an important dispersal vector. Some arctic species rely on sea ice to disperse their eggs, like Daphnia pulex. Drifting, as discussed above, can be an effective dispersal vector for marine mammals. It has been shown that intertidal benthic invertebrates will utilize sea ice as a raft to travel up to multiple kilometers.

Freshwater dispersal 
Freshwater dispersal primarily occurs through flowing water transporting dispersal units. Permanent aquatic environments require outside forms of dispersal to retain biodiversity, so hydrochory via freshwater is vital for the success of terrestrial water sources. Lakes remain genetically diverse thanks to rivers that connect lakes to new sources of biodiversity. In lakes that lack connecting rivers, some organisms have developed adaptations that utilize the wind, while in an aquatic environment, to disperse reproductive units. In these cases, the dispersal units are moved to new aquatic habitats by utilizing the wind instead of the water in their habitat. 

Running water is the only form of long distance dispersal present in freshwater sources, so rivers act as the main aquatic terrestrial dispersal vector. Like in marine ecosystems, organisms take advantage of flowing water via passive transport of drifting along on a raft. The distance traveled by floating or drifting organisms and propagules is determined primarily on the amount of time that organism or unit is able to retain buoyancy.

Freshwater is important for dispersal of non-aquatic terrestrial organisms as well. Bryophytes require an external source of water in order to sexually reproduce. Some bryophytes also utilize falling rain drops to maximize their spore dispersal distances.

Extreme weather 
Extreme weather events (tropical cyclones, floods and heavy rains, hurricanes, and thunderstorms) are the most intense examples of water functioning as a vector. The high intensity and high volume of rain that comes with these events facilitate long distance dispersal.

Overflow is traditionally a side effect of heavy rains impacting one specific area. Overflows have been shown to be effective in transmitting biodiversity between temporary lakes and ponds. The overflow of pool water acts as an important passive form of hydrochory in which water acts as a vector. Floods displace plants and organisms, whether or not overflow occurs. Macrophytes and organisms as small as zooplankton can be transported via flood pulses.

Hurricanes can also act as dispersal vectors. After the 2004 Hurricane Charley struck Florida, there was a higher reported dispersal of the propagules of red mangrove trees. If a hurricane strikes in the later summer months, there is an expected increase in the dispersal of propagules, while early storms can wash out immature propagules and decrease the dispersal of mature propagules for that season.

When extreme weather events occur over an open body of water, they can create intense waves.  These waves can create large dispersal within the water column by changing local water movement, but tend to constrict the actual dispersal distance for smaller organisms.

Human-created hydrochory 
The fishing industry has introduced new forms in which water acts as a dispersal vector. The water in bait buckets transfers bait everywhere a fisherman takes it, and this can introduce non-native species into areas should this bait water be spilt. This idea is applied on a much larger scale to the ballast tanks of ships. A study done by James Carlton of Williams College reports that more than 3000 species are moving across the ocean in ballast tanks on any given day.

Artificial waterways created by humans have also spurred new forms of hydrochory. Amphipods were found to be able to cross previously uncrossable areas to enter into new drainage pipe thanks to the construction of a canal.

Artificial waterways not only connect communities that are geographically close, but they also allow for the transmission of invasive species from distant communities. The distribution of invasive species is, in part, regulated by local ocean conditions and currents.

The introduction of human-generated waste, like wood planks and plastic bags, into water sources has increased the amount of viable rafts for dispersal.

Human-mediated dispersal 
Humans have been acting as dispersal vectors since we began moving around the planet, bringing non-native plants and animals with us. As trends in urbanization have increased, urban environments can act as staging grounds for species dispersal and invasion. Many non-native species exist in urban environments and the high rate of movement in and out of urban areas leads to a high level of dispersal to neighboring environments.

See also
Seed dispersal
Basal shoot
Myrmecochory
Oceanic dispersal
Biological dispersal
Diplochory
Diaspore (botany)
Disseminule
Zoophily
Pollination
Pollinators

References

Reproduction
Population ecology